On 20 January 2023, a man opened fire from his apartment balcony in Sagarejo, Kakheti, Georgia, killing four people and wounding five more. As police officers responded to the shooting, he opened fire again, killing an officer before he turned the gun on himself.

The perpetrator was identified as Nodar Atuashvili. He was a military veteran who served in the Defence Forces of Georgia from 2006 to 2021.

References 

2023 mass shootings in Europe

2020s murders in Georgia (country)
21st-century mass murder in Europe
January 2023 crimes in Europe
January 2023 events in Georgia (country)
Mass murder in 2023
Murder–suicides in Europe
2023 murders in Europe